Alexander Sebastián Sosa (born 18 May 2001) is an Argentine professional footballer who plays as a centre-forward for Patronato.

Career
Sosa began as a midfielder in the ranks of El Trébol in El Tío, before moving to Talleres at the age of fifteen. However, after not featuring at any level, Sosa left shortly after to rejoin El Trébol. He initially featured for their youth sides, though soon made his senior debut in Liga San Francisco; aged seventeen. In 2019, Sosa moved to Primera División team Patronato. He was instantly transformed into a centre-forward and scored on his academy debut for them. Gustavo Álvarez would later select Sosa for his club debut, as he featured for the final nine minutes of a Copa de la Liga Profesional loss to Huracán on 29 November 2020.

Career statistics
.

Notes

References

External links

2001 births
Living people
Sportspeople from Córdoba Province, Argentina
Argentine footballers
Association football forwards
Argentine Primera División players
Club Atlético Patronato footballers